Charnley is a surname. Notable people with the surname include:

Bill Charnley, English footballer
Bryan Charnley (1949–1991), English artist
Chic Charnley (born 1963), Scottish association football (soccer) player
Dave Charnley (1935–2012), English lightweight boxer
Donn Charnley (born 1928), American politician
Irene Charnley (born 1960), South African businesswoman
John Charnley (1911–1982), English orthopaedic surgeon
Josh Charnley (born 1991), English rugby league footballer
Ray Charnley (1935–2009), English association football (soccer) player
Sam Charnley (1902–1977), Scottish association football (soccer) player

See also
Hip prosthesis zones, including the DeLee and Charnley system